Strike Fighter Squadron 2 (VFA-2) also known as the "Bounty Hunters" is a United States Navy F/A-18F Super Hornet strike fighter squadron based at Naval Air Station Lemoore, California. Their tail code is NE and their callsign is "Bullet".

History
Four distinct squadrons have been designated VF-2. Officially, the US Navy does not recognize a direct lineage with disestablished squadrons if a new squadron is formed with the same designation. Often, the new squadron will assume the nickname, insignia, and traditions of the earlier squadrons.

1970s

VF-2, known as the "Bounty Hunters," was established on 14 October 1972 flying the F-14A Tomcat. VF-2 completed aircrew training and received its first Tomcats in July 1973, attaining full strength of 12 F-14As in the spring of 1974.

VF-2's initial deployment was in 1974 with her sister squadron VF-1 aboard . The squadron flew over Saigon in support of Operation Frequent Wind, the evacuation of US personnel in April, 1975.
Deployed on USS Enterprise Westpac 1978 Ports of call: Pearl Harbor Hawaii, Subic Bay Philippines, Singapore, Perth Australia, Hong Kong

1980s

The squadron was the first Tactical Air Reconnaissance Pod System (TARPS) unit for both CVW-14 and later CVW-2.

VF-2 deployed aboard  in 1984 and returned for multiple Ranger deployments throughout the 1980s.

On 2 June 1984, VF-2 became the first squadron to launch an F-14 from an aircraft carrier while towing an air-to-air gunnery target. In 1987, the squadron logged Ranger’s 260,000th landing.

1990s

The unit participated in Operation Desert Storm, flying over 500 combat mission from USS Ranger operating in the Persian Gulf. VF-2 performed escort, reconnaissance and Combat Air Patrol (CAP) missions. At the same time, VF-2 transitioned to the F-14D Tomcat. Several months after the 1995 cruise, VF-2 was awarded the battle "E" and relocated from NAS Miramar to NAS Oceana due to a Base Realignment and Closure (BRAC) decision to make Miramar a Marine Corps Air Station.

In April 1996, VF-2's F-14Ds were modified to carry the LANTIRN infrared targeting pod, giving them precision strike capabilities.

During their 1999 cruise, VF-2 supported Operation Southern Watch and on September 9, attacked Surface-to-Air Missile sites and anti-aircraft guns around Basra. The same day, a VF-2 Tomcat engaged 2 Iraqi Air Force MiG-23’s that were heading south into the No-Fly Zone from Al-Taqaddum Air Base, west of Baghdad with AIM-54 Phoenixes. The missiles did not score as the MiGs turned north once they detected the missile launch.

2000s

In mid 2001, VF-2 deployed aboard  in support of Operation Southern Watch.

During the 2002-2003 deployment, the final cruise with the Tomcat, VF-2 participated in Operation Iraqi Freedom flying a wide range of missions including reconnaissance, close air support, CAP and strike missions. On February 28, 2003, during Operation Southern Watch, a VF-2 aircraft delivered the 1st Tomcat JDAM in combat. During this deployment, VF-2 flew 483 sorties and dropped 294 Laser-guided bomb's/JDAMs/MK-82 bombs.

On 1 July 2003, VF-2 was redesignated VFA-2, and began transition to the F/A-18F Super Hornet receiving its first aircraft on 6 October 2003.

VFA-2 deployed to the Western Pacific aboard  with CVW-2 in October, 2004. They returned in March 2005 after supporting Operation Unified Assistance which provided humanitarian support to Southeast Asia after the 2004 Indian Ocean tsunami.

In 2006, VFA-2 and CVW-2 embarked on a WESTPAC deployment.

On 13 March 2008, VFA-2 embarked with CVW-2 aboard USS Abraham Lincoln on a 7-month deployment to the Persian Gulf, returning home on 8 October.

2010s
Between 24 and 31 March 2006, during Foal Eagle 2006 exercises, strike squadrons VFA-2, VFA-34, VFA-137, and VFA-151 teamed with U.S. Air Force aircraft from the 18th Wing based at Kadena Air Base to provide combat air patrols and coordinated bombing runs via the exercise's Combined Air Operations Center.

On 11 September 2010, VFA-2 deployed with CVW-2 aboard USS Abraham Lincoln to the Arabian Sea and Persian Gulf.

The squadron has transitioned to newer Block II F/A-18F Super Hornet equipped with the AESA radar.

2020s 
The squadrons current Commanding Officer, CDR Timmester, will be the last navy squadron commander to have flown in the F-14 Tomcat. VFA-2 is currently assigned to Carrier Air Wing 2 on the USS Carl Vinson.

See also
Naval aviation
Military aviation
List of United States Navy aircraft squadrons
List of Inactive United States Navy aircraft squadrons
VF-2 (1927-42)
VF-2 (1943-5)

References

External links

 
 
 

Strike fighter squadrons of the United States Navy
Military units and formations in California